Robbie Stirling (born 7 September 1960) is a Canadian former racing driver.

References

1960 births
Living people
Canadian racing drivers
International Formula 3000 drivers
24 Hours of Le Mans drivers
British Touring Car Championship drivers
Place of birth missing (living people)